Biuletyn Informacyjny ("Information Bulletin") was a Polish underground weekly published covertly in General Government territory of occupied Poland during World War II. The magazine was edited by Aleksander Kamiński and distributed as the main organ of ZWZ-AK headquarters in Warsaw, initially in order to inform the AK soldier about ongoing resistance activities. By 1944 Biuletyn Informacyjny had a circulation of 42,000-43,000 copies. The publishers recommended readers to have the articles reprinted in provincial underground publications throughout Poland.

History
The Bulletin was started in November 1939 in Warsaw as the main press release of the SZP, the first underground resistance organisation in Poland. Soon it was taken over by the Armia Krajowa and the Bureau of Information and Propaganda of the Polish government-in-exile. Since 1941 it had also several regional versions in all major cities of Poland, both under German and Soviet occupation. During the Warsaw Uprising it was published openly as a daily, the main press release of the Polish forces. After the capitulation of Warsaw it was published in Kraków until the dissolution of AK in January 1945.

On October 3, 1944 the Biuletyn Informacyjny published the following communiqué signed by Lieutenant-General Tadeusz Bór-Komorowski, Commander-in-Chief of the Home Army, after signing the act of surrender:

See also 

 Nowy Kurier Warszawski

References 

Warsaw Uprising
Defunct newspapers published in Poland
Poland in World War II
Newspapers published in Warsaw
Polish underground press in World War II
Publications established in 1939
Publications disestablished in 1945
Weekly newspapers published in Poland